Events from the year 1913 in Croatia.

Incumbents
 Monarch – Franz Joseph I
 Ban of Croatia – Slavko Cuvaj

Events
July 21 – Slavko Cuvaj relieved from the post of the Royal Commissioner for Croatia-Slovenia. He had been appointed in January 1912, when anti-Habsburg sentiments were on the rise in Croatia, often manifesting in sympathies for Serbia and calls for creation of Yugoslavia. Cuvaj tried to curb those trends by a series of decrees directed at curbing press freedom, limiting rights of assembly and local autonomy. This created a backlash in the form of strikes and demonstrations, and Cuvaj himself was target of two assassination attempts in 1912.
November 27 – Iván Skerlecz proclaimed Ban and called for parliamentary elections.
December 16–17 – Parliamentary elections are held in the Kingdom of Croatia-Slavonia. The Croat-Serb Coalition wins with 39.09% of the vote.

Arts and literature
Ivana Brlić-Mažuranić released the children's book The Brave Adventures of Lapitch (Čudnovate zgode šegrta Hlapića) in Zagreb.

Sport
Football club HNK Dinara founded in Knin (as SK Lav).

Births
January 7 – Franjo Glaser, footballer (died 2003)
January 9 – Fedor Hanžeković, film director (died 1997)
February 22 – Ranko Marinković, writer (died 2001)
March 21 – Ivan Goran Kovačić, poet and writer (died 1943)
April 8 – Rudi Supek, sociologist (died 1993)
November 25 – Franjo Punčec, tennis player (died 1985)

Deaths
October 7 – Ivan Banjavčić, politician (born 1843)
April 16 – Miroslav Kraljević, painter (born 1885)

References

 
Years of the 20th century in Croatia
Croatia